The Vasilian College or Vasilian Academy was an institution of higher learning in Iași, the Principality of Moldavia, founded by Prince Vasile Lupu in 1640.

Established in the capital of Moldavia as a "higher school for Latin and Slavonic languages", it functioned on the model of the Mohyla Academy in Kyiv, from where some of the professors came. It was disestablished some time after the end of Lupu's reign (1653).

The Academia Vasiliană was the first institute of higher education that functioned on the territory of Romania and it was symbolically continued by the Princely Academy of Iași (1707-1821), the Academia Mihăileană (1835-1847) and the Alexandru Ioan Cuza University (1860–present).

See also
 The Princely Academy
 Academia Mihăileană
 Alexandru Ioan Cuza University

References

History of Moldavia (1504–1711)
Alexandru Ioan Cuza University
1640 establishments in Europe
1640 establishments in the Ottoman Empire
17th-century establishments in Moldavia
Educational institutions established in the 1640s
Buildings and structures in Iași